Bob Wilkie (born February 11, 1969) is a Canadian former professional ice hockey player who played 18 games in the National Hockey League games with the Detroit Red Wings and Philadelphia Flyers between 1990 and 1994. The rest of his career, which lasted from 1989 to 2000, was spent in the minor leagues.

Career statistics

Regular season and playoffs

External links
 

1969 births
Living people
Adirondack Red Wings players
Anchorage Aces players
Augsburger Panther players
Calgary Rad'z players
Calgary Wranglers (WHL) players
Canadian expatriate ice hockey players in Germany
Canadian ice hockey defencemen
Cincinnati Cyclones (IHL) players
Detroit Red Wings draft picks
Detroit Red Wings players
Fort Wayne Komets players
Fresno Falcons players
Hershey Bears players
Indianapolis Ice players
Las Vegas Thunder players
Maine Mariners players
Pensacola Ice Pilots players
Ice hockey people from Calgary
Philadelphia Flyers players
Swift Current Broncos players